Utricularia beaugleholei is a terrestrial carnivorous plant that belongs to the genus Utricularia (family Lentibulariaceae). Its distribution ranges from southeastern South Australia through central and western Victoria into New South Wales, where it has been collected from the southern tablelands and southwest slopes.

See also 
 List of Utricularia species

References 

Carnivorous plants of Australia
Flora of New South Wales
Flora of South Australia
Flora of Victoria (Australia)
beaugleholei
Lamiales of Australia